Phillipsburg may refer to some places in the United States:

Phillipsburg, Georgia
Phillipsburg, Kansas
Phillipsburg, Kentucky
Phillipsburg, Missouri
Phillipsburg, New Jersey
Phillipsburg, Ohio

See also
Philippsburg (disambiguation)
Philipsburg (disambiguation)